Pieter Aldrich and Danie Visser won in the final 7–6, 6–3 against Jorge Lozano and Todd Witsken.

Seeds
Champion seeds are indicated in bold text while text in italics indicates the round in which those seeds were eliminated.

  Kelly Evernden /  Johan Kriek (semifinals)
  Jorge Lozano /  Todd Witsken (final)
  Tim Wilkison /  Blaine Willenborg (first round)
  Steve Denton /  Sammy Giammalva Jr. (first round)

Draw

References
 General

 Specific

1988 U.S. Men's Clay Court Championships